The 2022 English women's football summer transfer window runs from 10 June to 31 August 2022. Players without a club may be signed at any time, clubs may sign players on loan dependent on their league's regulations, and clubs may sign a goalkeeper on an emergency loan if they have no registered senior goalkeeper available. This list includes transfers featuring at least one club from either the Women's Super League or the Women's Championship that were completed after the end of the winter 2021–22 transfer window on 2 February and before the end of the 2022 summer window.

Transfers
All players and clubs without a flag are English.

References 
 Football transfer window summer 2022 – Europe’s top five women’s leagues, The Guardian

2022–23 in English football
England women
Summer 2022 women